George Edward Lockhart (February 4, 1902 – 1991) was a farmer and politician in Ontario, Canada. He represented Rainy River in the Legislative Assembly of Ontario from 1943 to 1945 as a Co-operative Commonwealth Federation (CCF) member.

The son of Edward Albert Lockhart and Sarah Maria Williams, he was born in Stratton and was educated there. In 1927, Lockhart married Florence M. Gamsby. He was a director for a local creamery and also served as its president.

References

External links

1902 births
1991 deaths
Ontario Co-operative Commonwealth Federation MPPs
20th-century Canadian politicians